Vavatsinia is a village in the Larnaca District of Cyprus, east of Agioi Vavatsinias. Its population in 2011 was 81.

References

Communities in Larnaca District